Thomas "Shang" Draper (1839–1883) was a criminal shanghaier, saloon keeper, and criminal gang leader in New York City along the city waterfront.

Criminal career
Shang Draper ran a waterfront saloon in his native New York City, where he performed a confidence scam using an underage girl to lure a mark to a dark hotel room (which Draper owned) only to rob him. Draper acquired his distinctive nickname "Shang" from the "shanghaiing" trick he used to play on his unsuspecting patrons. Draper would drug a bar patron with laudanum and by the time the fellow awoke, he would have been pressed into merchant marine or naval service, sometimes for a foreign land.

Draper was a contemporary of Frederika Mandelbaum, a notorious gangleader in her own right, also based in his native New York City. Mandlebaum installed Draper, one of her trusted lieutenants, in a bank robbery gang fronted by George Leslie.

Death
Thomas Draper died in 1883 in New York City.

References

1839 births
1883 deaths
Gang members of New York City